This is a list of monasteries in Armenia.

Monasteries

Temples and church complex

See also
 List of castles in Armenia
 List of caravanserais in Armenia

References 

Monasteries
Christian monasteries in Armenia
Armenia
Armenia